The 1989 FIRS Intercontinental Cup was the fourth edition of the roller hockey tournament known as the Intercontinental Cup, played in January 1989. HC Liceo La Coruña won the cup, defeating CDU Estudiantil.

Matches

See also
FIRS Intercontinental Cup

References 

FIRS Intercontinental Cup
1989 in roller hockey
1989 in Spanish sport
International roller hockey competitions hosted by Spain